Thomas John Wynn, 2nd Baron Newborough (3 April 1802 – 15 November 1832) was a British peer.

Background
Newborough was the elder son of Thomas Wynn, 1st Baron Newborough of Glynllifon, and Maria Stella Petronilla, daughter of Lorenzo Chiappini.

Political career
Newborough succeeded his father in the barony in 1807. However, as this was an Irish peerage it did not entitle him to a seat in the House of Lords. He was instead elected to the House of Commons for Carnarvonshire in 1826, a seat he held until 1830.

Personal life
Lord Newborough died in November 1832, aged 30. He was unmarried and was succeeded by his younger brother, Spencer Bulkeley Wynn, 3rd Baron Newborough.

References

External links 
 

1802 births
1832 deaths
Barons in the Peerage of Ireland
Members of the Parliament of the United Kingdom for Welsh constituencies
UK MPs 1826–1830
UK MPs who inherited peerages
Place of birth missing